The Campaign of Sucre in Upper Peru was a set of military operations conducted by the Liberator United Army of Peru to dislodge the Spanish royalists in Upper Peru or Charcas. They were started after the Battle of Ayacucho and concluded with the surrender of the last royalist groups after the Battle of Tumusla.

On February 6 Marshal Sucre at the head of the Liberation Army crossed the Desaguadero River to occupy La Paz. General Jose Maria Cordova, with his Colombian division, stayed in La Paz for three months. Francisco Burdett O'Connor commanded the division of Peru to invade Upper Peru to Potosí.

Royalist general Pedro Antonio Olañeta held out in Potosí, hearing of the defection half of his forces under Col. Medinaceli, with Olañeta attacking them on April 1, 1825. Olaneta was wounded in combat and fell to the ground. His soldiers surrendered. Olaneta died the following day, April 2. That same day Col. Medinaceli referred the part of the battle to Marshal Sucre, who ended the military campaign.

References

See also 
Antonio José de Sucre

Conflicts in 1825